Flash and Bones is the fourteenth novel by Kathy Reichs starring forensic anthropologist Temperance Brennan.

Plot
Brennan is called to examine a body found in a barrel of asphalt beside the racetrack in Charlotte, North Carolina. Things get very complicated when a toxic substance is found in the body, and the FBI seizes all evidence and the body.

Critical Reception
David Connett of the Daily Express rated the book 3/5, calling it "an intriguing tale embroiling southern redneck militia and Nascar racing."

External links
 Kathy Reichs' site on Flash and Bones

References

Novels by Kathy Reichs
2011 American novels
American crime novels
Charles Scribner's Sons books
Heinemann (publisher) books